Lewis Arnold is an English director working in television. He is best known for the shows Time, Humans, Broadchurch and Des.

Arnold studied at the University of Gloucestershire and graduated in 2007 with a 1st Class Honours degree in Video Production. He later studied an MA in Directing Fiction at the National Film and Television School, graduating in 2013.

Television 
On graduating from the National Film and Television School in March 2013, Arnold embarked on his first TV project, directing two episodes of the final series of BAFTA-winning channel 4 show, Misfits. He then directed the first four episodes of Russell T Davies’s new E4 show, Banana, and was named a Broadcast Magazine Hot Shot 2014 for his work on both shows.

In 2015, he directed two episodes of C4/AMC series Humans, which has become Channel 4's most successful original drama in over 20 years. A second series was recommissioned and a year later he returned to direct the opening block. He followed this up by directing an episode of British crime drama Broadchurch for Sister Pictures.

In 2017/18 Arnold directed Cleaning Up for ITV and Sister Pictures, having developed the project with writer and creator Mark Marlow. The six part drama show stars Sheridan Smith as Sam, a cleaning lady and devoted mother who struggles to keep her family together after becoming addicted to online gambling.

In 2020 Arnold co-created and directed the ITV miniseries Des. The series was well received by critics and described as a "sensitive, finely worked drama showing the unrelentingly bleak reality of the monstrous narcissist". Tennant's performance was considered "one of his best in an impeccable career" earning him a National Television Award for Best Dramatic Performance in 2021. The premiere episode had consolidated viewing figures of 11.4 million viewers, a benchmark previously hit in 2019 with Cleaning Up.

In 2020, Arnold directed Jimmy McGovern's Time, a three part prison drama for BBC One. The drama starred Sean Bean and Stephen Graham and was aired June 2021. The show was widely praised for its authenticity and central performances. Lucy Mangan wrote for The Guardian: "The performances of Bean and Graham are, even though we have come to expect brilliance from them both, astonishing. So, too, are those from everyone in smaller roles, none of which is underwritten or sketchy, and who thicken the drama into something more profoundly moving and enraging at every turn." Billie Schwab Dunn, writing for Metro, praised the show saying, "Time is a necessary lesson on the British prison system and a masterclass in acting."

Short films 
On graduating from university in 2007, Arnold was awarded two consecutive digital short commissions through the UKFC and Screen WM. His film Stained, written by Ronnie Thompson and starring Ricci Harnet, Frank Harper and Craig Conway was selected for numerous film festivals, leading to nominations at the Midland Royal Television Society Awards for Best New Talent, Best Short Film and Best Director.

Whilst at the National Film and Television School, Arnold's short film Echo written by James Walker and starring Lauren Carse and Oliver Woolford screened at a host of international film festivals including Rotterdam International Film Festival, picking up awards including a National Film Award for Best Short in 2015. The film "centres on an outstanding performance from young lead Lauren Carse and a subtle, yet powerful story."

His NFTS graduation film Charlie Says written by Frances Poletti and produced by Rob Darnell, premiered at Edinburgh International Film Festival in 2013. Based on an incident Arnold had on a childhood holiday, the film centres around themes of deceit and masculinity. Starring Elliott Tittensor and Christine Bottomley the film focus on a debut performance from a thirteen-year-old Conner Chapman.

Filmography

Television 
Sherwood (2022)
Time (2021)
Des (2020)
Dark Money (2019)
Cleaning Up (2019)
Broadchurch (2017)
Humans (2016) (2014)
Prey II (2015)
Banana (2014)
Misfits (2013)

Short films 
Sunday, Sunday (2017)
Charlie Says (2013)
Echo (2013)
Stained (2010)
Spirited (2009)
Leave of Absence (2007)

References

Living people
Alumni of the University of Gloucestershire
Alumni of the National Film and Television School
English television directors
Year of birth missing (living people)